Selayang Newtown is the capital of Gombak District, Selangor, Malaysia. The capital moved from Rawang to Selayang Newtown in 1997. The capital is named after Selayang, a town located 2 km southeast of Selayang Newtown.

Selayang Newtown is also a major residential area in Selayang with a number of neighbourhoods and apartment complexes.

Neighbourhoods 
 Dataran Templer
 Pinggiran Templer
 Sungai Tua

Apartment complexes 
 Kenanga
 Teratai
 Dahlia (A) and (B)
 Cempaka
 Seroja
 Julia
 Melor
 Kipark
 Bomba 
 Mas Merah
 Mas Ayu

Selayang Newtown also has a multi-purpose stadium, a public library, mosque, court and three primary schools.

Schools
Sekolah Kebangsaan Bandar Baru Selayang
Sekolah Kebangsaan Bandar Baru Selayang (2)
Sekolah Agama Rendah Al-Furqan

Clinic and hospital
Hospital Selayang
Klinik Kesihatan Selayang Baru

Gombak District
Towns in Selangor